Anders Oddli (born 22 April 1994) is a Norwegian road and track cyclist, who currently rides for UCI Continental team . Representing Norway at international competitions, Oddli competed at the 2016 UEC European Track Championships in the scratch event.

References

External links

1994 births
Living people
Norwegian male cyclists
Norwegian track cyclists
Place of birth missing (living people)
21st-century Norwegian people